This family of alga is known from Permian to Cretaceous strata. It has been aligned with the chlorophytes and rhodophytes; whilst the latter is the most widely held opinion, some authors still consider a green algal affinity possible.

References 

Red algae families
Enigmatic red algae taxa
Fossil algae
Permian first appearances
Cretaceous extinctions
Fossils of Serbia